Negeri Sembilan Matrix Basketball Club, also known simply as NS Matrix, is a Malaysian professional basketball club.

History
The Negeri Sembilan (NS) Matrix basketball team was established in 2015 and is owned by Matrix Holding Concept Bhd. It is a frequent participant of the Agong Cup. With its roster having players from the Malaysian national team, they are a four-time Agong Cup champions. The club also has a women's team.

NS Matrix is among the six teams of the inaugural season of the Major Basketball League (MBL) of Malaysia in 2022.

They also joined the ASEAN Basketball League and made their debut in the 2023 season.

Home arenas
MABA Stadium (2023–present)

Season by season

Current roster

This is the lineup of the NS Matrix for the 2023 ABL season.

Coaches
 Brian Lester (–2020)
 Jeff Viernes (2022–present)

Honours
Agong Cup
Winners (4): 2016, 2017, 2018, 2019
Major Basketball League
Winners (1): 2022

External links

References

Sport in Negeri Sembilan
Basketball teams in Malaysia
2015 establishments in Malaysia